The Rochester Renegade (later Rochester Renegades) were a professional basketball team based in Rochester, Minnesota. They played 2 seasons in the Continental Basketball Association (CBA), the defunct development league for the National Basketball Association (NBA).

History
After the Birmingham Bandits of Birmingham, Alabama had recorded the worst attendance of the CBA in the 1991–92 season, on May 28, 1992 their owner Tom McMillan announced that the Kahler Corporation had acquired the franchise, and the team was relocated to Rochester, Minnesota, becoming the Rochester Renegade. The team was intentionally named Renegade and not Renegades, and played their games at the Mayo Civic Center, while the team had their headquarters at 100 First Ave. SW in Rochester. The Renegade were affiliated with two NBA teams: the Atlanta Hawks and the Utah Jazz. The CBA placed the team in the Mideast Division of the American Conference, together with the Rockford Lightning, the Quad City Thunder and the La Crosse Catbirds. In their first season under coach Ron Ekker the team finished with the worst record in CBA history with 6 wins and 50 losses. Forward Tony Farmer led the team in scoring with 22.5 points per game in 16 appearances, while Ronnie Grandison averaged a double-double with 19.9 points and 10.6 rebounds in 23 games played.

In July 1993 the team management named Bill Musselman head coach and vice-president of basketball operations. The name changed to Rochester Renegades and the team colors switched from white, green and blue to white, red and black. In the 1993–94 season the Renegades won 31 games, losing 25, and qualified for the playoffs. During the season Dell Demps was called up to the NBA by the Golden State Warriors, and two Renegades player won personal awards: Ronnie Grandison was name the CBA MVP, while Rodney Monroe was the Newcomer of the Year. The 1993–94 Renegades team used 41 different players, some of them only for 1 game; Monroe was the team leader in points per game with 20.2, while Grandison contributed with 16.5 points and 11.8 rebounds.

Despite the improved performance of the second season, the team still had one of the worst attendance records in the CBA with 2,200 tickets sold per game: owner Tom McMillan sold the team in May 1994, and the franchise relocated to Harrisburg, Pennsylvania, becoming the Harrisburg Hammerheads.

Season-by-season records

All-time roster

George Ackles
Ron Anderson
Elmer Bennett
Curtis Blair
David Cain
Rick Calloway
Chris Collier
Michael Cutright
David Daniels
Dell Demps
Radenko Dobraš
Patrick Eddie
Jay Edwards
Ron Ellis
A. J. English
Tony Farmer
Steve Garrity
Jay Goodman
Orlando Graham
Ronnie Grandison
Jerome Harmon
David Harris
Kevin Holland
Mike Hopkins
Anthony Houston
Alfredrick Hughes
Mike Iuzzolino
Dave Jamerson
Adonis Jordan
Stan Kimbrough
Frank Kornet
Kurk Lee
Vada Martin
Gary Massey
Wes Matthews
Travis Mays
Ralph McPherson
Cozell McQueen
Scott Meents
Jared Miller
Dirk Minniefield
Rodney Monroe
Tod Murphy
Dyron Nix
Alan Ogg
Leo Parent
Bobby Parks
Danny Pearson
Elliot Perry
Kenny Perry
Mike Ratliff
Eddie Rivera
Melvin Robinson
Elbert Rogers
Bennie Seltzer
Matt Steigenga
Brook Steppe
Jerry Stroman
Lamont Strothers
Brett Szabo
Jay Taylor
Stephen Thompson
Gundars Vētra
Bruce Wheatley
Clinton Wheeler
Nikita Wilson

Sources

Awards
CBA Most Valuable Player: Ronnie Grandison (1993–94)
CBA Newcomer of the Year: Rodney Monroe (1993–94)

References

Basketball teams in Minnesota
1992 establishments in Minnesota
Continental Basketball Association teams
Sports in Minnesota
Basketball teams established in 1992
1994 disestablishments in Minnesota
Sports clubs disestablished in 1994
Sports in Rochester, Minnesota